Auteco (Auto Tecnica Colombiana S.A) is a Colombian motor vehicle manufacturer. It was the first motorcycle assembler in the country.

History

Auteco was founded on 1 September 1941 in Medellín.  It initially distributed spare parts and petrol.

In 1945 Auteco began importing American Indian motorcycles.  It then went on to import Excelsior motorbikes, as well as vehicles produced by Nash, Renault and Gravely.

In 1954 Auteco acquired the right to assemble and sell Lambretta scooters in Colombia.  These would later be assembled at a newly built factory in Itagüí, Antioquia, constructed in 1962.
These scooters were all badged Auteco Lambretta. They were based at various times on the Li and GP ranges, as well as Servetas.  Many were hybrids, depending on what components were currently available.  Production ceased at some time during the 1970s.

In 1972 Auteco formed a business partnership with Kawasaki to build its motorcycles under licence.  This was expanded in the economic downturn of the late 1980s to include electrical generators and mowers.

In the early 1990s Auteco formed an additional business partnership with the Indian Bajaj company and reintroduced scooters to Colombia.  They also obtained a licence to sell the Bajaj auto rickshaw.

Further expansion took place in 2003 when Auteco began importing Taiwanese Kymco motorcycles.

Models distributed by Auteco in 2010
 Bajaj Auto rickshaw
 Bajaj Boxer CT 100
 Bajaj Caliber 115
 Bajaj Discover 135
 Bajaj Platina 100
 Bajaj Pulsar
 Bajaj XCD 125
 Kawasaki Ninja 650R
 Kawasaki KMX 125
 Kawasaki Versys
 Kawasaki ZX130
 Kawasaki Ninja 250R
 Kymco Activ 110
 Kymco Agility 125
 Kymco Agility RS 125
 Kymco Agility City 150
 Kymco Bet&Win 250

See also
 List of motor scooter manufacturers and brands

References

External links 
 Official Auteco Site

Motorcycle manufacturers of Colombia
Scooter manufacturers
Companies based in Medellín
Vehicle manufacturing companies established in 1941
Colombian brands
1941 establishments in Colombia